Prosiren is an extinct genus of prehistoric amphibian in the family Prosirenidae. It was originally placed in the family Sirenidae.

See also
 Prehistoric amphibian
 List of prehistoric amphibians

References

Albanerpetontidae
Cretaceous Texas
Fossil taxa described in 1958